The Sarantaporos is a river in northwestern Greece and southern Albania. It is a right tributary of the river Aoös (Vjosë), which flows into the Adriatic Sea. Its source is between the mountain ranges Gramos and Voio, in the Kastoria regional unit. It flows through the municipal units Arrenes, Mastorochoria and Konitsa in Greece, and the municipalities Qendër Leskovik and Çarshovë in Albania.

See also
List of rivers of Albania
List of rivers of Greece

References

Rivers of Albania
Rivers of Greece
International rivers of Europe
Epirus
Landforms of Kastoria (regional unit)
Rivers of Western Macedonia
Landforms of Ioannina (regional unit)
Rivers of Epirus (region)
Pindus
Albania–Greece border
Border rivers